The 2000 AFL draft was the annual draft of talented Australian rules football players by teams that participate in the Australian Football League.  It consisted of a pre-season draft, a national draft, a trade period and a rookie elevation.

In 2000 there were 87 picks to be drafted between 16 teams in the national draft. The St Kilda Football Club received the first pick in the national draft after finishing on the bottom of the ladder during the 2000 AFL season.

Trades 
In alphabetical order of new clubs

2000 national draft

2001 pre-season draft

2001 rookie draft

Rookie elevation
In alphabetical order of professional clubs. This list details 2000-listed rookies who were elevated to the senior list; it does not list players taken as rookies in the rookie draft which occurred during the 2000/01 off-season.

References
 Official AFL draft history page 
 2000 Pre-season draft

AFL Draft
Australian Football League draft